Hayden Sargis (born May 2, 2002) is an American professional soccer player who plays as a defender for Major League Soccer club D.C. United.

Club career and early life
Sargis was born in Carson City, Nevada and is Assyrian. Sargis began his career as part of the Sacramento Republic youth academy in 2015. While with the academy, Sargis also spent time training at the Barcelona US-based academy in Arizona. He then made his first appearance on the bench for the Sacramento Republic first team on August 7, 2019 against Las Vegas Lights.

On January 15, 2020, it was announced that Sargis, alongside academy teammate Mario Penagos, had signed a professional contract with the Sacramento Republic in the USL Championship. He then made his competitive debut for the club on March 7 against Tulsa. He started and played the entire match as Sacramento Republic drew 1–1.

On January 24, 2022, Sargis signed with MLS side D.C. United on a three-year deal through 2024 with options in 2025 and 2026. Sargis began the 2022 season on loan to D.C. United's reserve squad, Loudoun United FC, where he made his debut on March 13, 2022. Sargis made his D.C. United debut on April 19, 2022 in a 3–0 victory against Flower City Union in the U.S. Open Cup.

On September 8, 2022, Sargis joined USL Championship club Phoenix Rising FC on loan for the remainder of the 2022 season.

Career statistics

Club

References

External links
Profile at the Sacramento Republic FC website

2002 births
Living people
People from Carson City, Nevada
People from Turlock, California
American people of Assyrian descent
American soccer players
Association football defenders
Sacramento Republic FC players
USL Championship players
Soccer players from California
Soccer players from Nevada
D.C. United players
Loudoun United FC players
Phoenix Rising FC players